Anthony Russell or Russel may refer to:

Anthony Russel (c. 1663–1743), English portrait-painter
Anthony Russell (bishop), Anglican bishop
Anthony Russell (British singer), contestant on Series 15 of The X Factor (British)
Anthony Russell (American singer) (born 1980), American singer
Anthony Russell, character in Inappropriate Comedy
Tony Russell, Australian rules footballer

See also
Anthony Russell-Wood (1940–2010), Welsh historian of Brazil
Anthony Russell-Roberts (born 1944), British businessman and opera manager
Tony Russel (1925–2017), American actor